The Six Days of Brussels was a six-day track cycling race held annually in Brussels, Belgium.

Rik Van Steenbergen holds the record of victories, winning 8 times.

Winners

References

External links

Cycle races in Belgium
Six-day races
Recurring sporting events established in 1912
1912 establishments in Belgium
Defunct cycling races in Belgium